This is a list of ambassadors of Canada to Russia from 1993 to present, and of Canadian ambassadors to the Soviet Union from 1954–1992.

Canadian ambassadors to Russia 
The office of the Canadian ambassador to Russia is located at the Canadian Embassy in Moscow.

Canadian ambassadors to the Soviet Union (1954–1992)

See also 
 Canada–Russia relations
 Embassy of Canada in Moscow

References

Russia

Canada